Get Up may refer to:

Film and television
 Get Up! (film), a 2003 Japanese film directed by Kazuyuki Izutsu
 Get Up (film), a 2008 South Korean television film directed by Lee Jae-dong
 Get Up! (TV program), a 2018 American morning sports talk program on ESPN

Music

Albums
 Get Up! (Ben Harper and Charlie Musselwhite album) or the title song, 2013
 Get Up (Bryan Adams album), 2015
 Get Up (Richie Kotzen album) or the title song, 2004
 Get Up! (Helix EP) or the title song, 2006
 Get Up! (Soulhead EP) or the title song, 2003
 Get Up, by Ed Mann, 1988
 Get Up, by Jessi, 2005

Songs
 "Get Up" (50 Cent song), 2008
 "Get Up" (Amel Larrieux song), 1999
 "Get Up!" (Beverley Knight song), 2001
 "Get Up" (Ciara song), 2006 (for the 2016 song by R3hab and Ciara, see below)
 "Get Up!" (Korn song), 2011
 "Get Up" (Lost Boyz song), 1996
 "Get Up" (Mary Mary song), 2008
 "Get Up" (Nate Dogg song), 2003
 "Get Up" (R3hab and Ciara song), 2016
 "Get Up" (R.E.M. song), 1988
 "Get Up" (Shinedown song), 2018
 "Get Up" (You Am I song), 2001
 "Get Up!" (Yuma Nakayama song), 2014
 "Get Up (A Cowboys Anthem)", by Kelly Clarkson, 2012
 "Get Up! (Before the Night Is Over)", by Technotronic, 1990
 "Get Up (I Feel Like Being a) Sex Machine", by James Brown, 1970
 "Get Up (Rattle)", by Bingo Players, 2012
 "Get Up", by Badmarsh & Shri from Signs, 2001
 "Get Up", by Big Time Rush from 24/Seven, 2013
 "Get Up", by Bombay Bicycle Club from Everything Else Has Gone Wrong, 2020
 "Get Up", by Brass Construction, 1978
 "Get Up", by Breaking Point from Coming of Age, 2001
 "Get Up", by Brokencyde from I'm Not a Fan, But the Kids Like It!, 2009
 "Get Up", by the Coup from Party Music, 2001
 "Get Up", by DJ Ross vs DY, 2005
 "Get Up", by JustFun, 2021
 "Get Up", by Mayday Parade from Anywhere but Here, 2009
 "Get Up", by Nik Kershaw from To Be Frank, 2001
 "Get Up", by Slaughterhouse from Welcome to: Our House, 2012
 "Get Up", by Sleater-Kinney from The Hot Rock, 1999
 "Get Up", by Superchick from Karaoke Superstars, 2001
 "Get Up", by Unwritten Law from Here's to the Mourning, 2005
 "Get Up", by Van Halen from 5150, 1986
 "Get Up", by Whitesnake from Flesh & Blood, 2019
 "Get Up", by Xiu Xiu from Forget, 2017
 "Get Up", by Zolani Mahola from the film Zambezia, 2012

Other uses
 GetUp!, an Australian political campaigning organization

See also
 Get Up, Stand Up (disambiguation)
 Get On Up (disambiguation)